Jon Clifford Kelly (born November 21, 1965) is a former butterfly swimmer from Canada, who competed for his native country at the 1988 Summer Olympics in Seoul, South Korea.  There he finished in 7th position in the 200-metre butterfly finals, and in twelfth place in the 400-metre individual medley.  He won a silver and two bronze medals at the 1990 Commonwealth Games in Auckland, New Zealand.  He was inducted into the University of Victoria Sports Hall of Fame in 2006.  He was born in Maria, Quebec.

See also
 List of Commonwealth Games medallists in swimming (men)

References

1965 births
Living people
Canadian male butterfly swimmers
Canadian male freestyle swimmers
Canadian male medley swimmers
Olympic swimmers of Canada
Swimmers at the 1988 Summer Olympics
Swimmers at the 1990 Commonwealth Games
Commonwealth Games medallists in swimming
Commonwealth Games silver medallists for Canada
Commonwealth Games bronze medallists for Canada
People from Maria, Quebec
20th-century Canadian people
21st-century Canadian people
Medallists at the 1990 Commonwealth Games